The  (also romanized  or ) were a group of Japanese mendicant monks of the Fuke school of Zen Buddhism who flourished during the Edo period (1603–1867).  were characterized by a straw basket (a sedge or reed hood known as a ) worn on the head, manifesting the absence of specific ego but also useful for traveling incognito. These pieces, called  ("fundamental pieces"), were played during a meditative practice called , in return for alms, as a method of attaining enlightenment, and as a healing modality.

During the Meiji period (1868–1912), the Japanese government formally abolished the Fuke sect. Documentation of the musical repertoire of the performers survived, and it has been revived in the 21st century.

History 

Though the  named their sect Fuke-shū, the sect was never acknowledged as a sect or a sub-sect of Rinzai school of Zen Buddhism.  is the Japanese form of Puhua, a peer of Linji Yixuan (Rinzai), a Zen teacher active in China in the 9th century. Puhua is also mentioned in the Rinzai Analects as a strange person who walked around ringing a bell to summon others to enlightenment.

 first appeared in the 17th century, though predecessors are depicted in paintings and texts from around 1500 onwards.

Travel around Japan was heavily restricted in the Edo period, but the   managed to obtain a rare exemption from the Tokugawa shogunate, most likely for political reasons. To be given a free pass in these times was a highly unusual and very special exemption from travel restrictions, and some researchers argue that in return for this privilege the  had to report back to the central government about conditions in the provinces. 

When the Tokugawa shogunate came to power over a unified Japan at the beginning of the 17th century, the  came under criticism for the first time. Because many new  had formerly been samurai disenfranchised during the Sengoku period (16th century), the potential for trouble was obvious.

Etymology
The last character, means "priest, monk".

The earliest , predecessors of the later "priests of nothingness", were poor beggar monks without any social status in society. The later , on the other hand, had to be of samurai family, even though the practice of teaching  to townspeople had become very popular already in the early 18th century.

Flute

True  are made of bamboo and can be very expensive.

Disguise and outfit

The idea was that the wearing of such a hat removed the ego of the wearer, whilst also concealing their identity.

Historical end
After the Tokugawa shogunate fell to the loyal forces of the Emperor,  temples and their monks were abolished in 1871.

References

Liner notes from the music CD Komuso: The Healing Art of Zen Shakuhachi, Ronnie Nyogetsu Seldin, shakuhachi. 2000, The Relaxation Company

External links

History of the shakuhachi and the komuso monks

Buddhist music
Japanese traditional music
Komuso
Fuke Zen
Buddhism in the Edo period
Japanese words and phrases